The 1907 Kentucky gubernatorial election was held on November 5, 1907. Republican nominee Augustus E. Willson defeated Democratic nominee Samuel Wilbur Hager with 51.17% of the vote.

General election

Candidates
Major party candidates
Augustus E. Willson, Republican 
Samuel Wilbur Hager, Democratic

Other candidates
L. L. Pickett, Prohibition
Claude Andrews, Socialist
James H. Arnold, Socialist Labor

Results

References

1907
Kentucky
1907 Kentucky elections